The Korea Baptist Convention is a Baptist Christian denomination in South Korea. It is affiliated with the Baptist World Alliance. The headquarters is in Seoul.

History
The Korea Baptist Convention has its origins in the early Baptist churches established by Canadian missionary Malcolm Fenwick in 1896.  The International Mission Board also contributed to the planting of churches.  The Convention is officially founded in 1949. According to a denomination census released in 2020, it claimed 3,376 churches and 520,000 members.

See also
 Bible
 Born again
 Baptist beliefs
 Worship service (evangelicalism)
 Jesus Christ
 Believers' Church

References

External links
 Official website

Baptist Christianity in South Korea
Baptist denominations in Asia
Christian organizations established in 1949
Baptist denominations established in the 20th century
1949 establishments in South Korea